Old Gold (1989–1991) is a compilation album by American noise rock band Cows. It is composed of material from three of their earlier albums Daddy Has a Tail, Effete and Impudent Snobs, and Peacetika.

Track listing
 "Shaking"- 2:47
 "Camouflage Monkey" - 2:14
 "Part My Konk" - 6:09
 "Bum In The Alley" - 3:20
 "By The Throat" - 2:08
 "I Miss Her Beer" - 2:09
 "Sugar" - 2:47
 "Chasin' Darla" - 4:28
 "Sticky & Sweet" - 4:33
 "Memorial" - 4:23
 "Dirty Leg" - 2:39
 "Big Mickey" - 3:15
 "Preyed On"- 3:34
 "Whitey In The Woodpile" - 2:18
 "Cartoon Corral" - 1:41
 "Little Bit" - 4:11
 "Hitting The Wall" - 2:41
 "I'm Missing" - 3:56
 "Can't Die" - 3:07
 "3-Way Lisa" - 2:59
 "Good Cop" - 2:38
 "Peacetika" - 4:14
 "One O'Clock High" - 3:37

Personnel
Cows
Thor Eisentrager – guitar
Kevin Rutmanis – bass guitar
Shannon Selberg – vocals
Norm Rogers - drums
Tony Oliveri - drums

Release history

References

External links 
 

1996 compilation albums
Cows (band) albums
Amphetamine Reptile Records compilation albums